The 2003 Monte Carlo Rally (formally the 71st Rallye Automobile de Monte-Carlo) was the first round of the 2003 World Rally Championship. The race was held over three days between 24 and 26 January 2003, and was won by Citroën's Sébastien Loeb, his 2nd win in the World Rally Championship.

Background

Entry list

Itinerary
All dates and times are CET (UTC+1).

Report

Overall

World Rally Cars

Classification

Special stages

Championship standings

Junior World Rally Championship

Classification

Special stages

Championship standings

References

External links 
 Official website of the World Rally Championship

Monte Carlo
Monte Carlo Rally
Rally
Monte Carlo Rally